Face the Music is a British panel game show that originally aired on BBC2 from 3 August 1967 to 2 January 1977 and then moved to BBC1 from 17 April 1983 to 16 December 1984 with Joseph Cooper hosting the entire run.

The theme music for the show was the Popular Song from the Façade suite by Sir William Walton (who was a guest on the programme in his 70th birthday year). During its most popular period the programme had a weekly audience of over 4 million.

Format
The programme, chaired by Joseph Cooper, took the form of a quiz, with a panel of three music-loving celebrities, but without scoring or any winner. Each week there would be a special guest, who would also have to answer questions – with the focus being on topics that related to the guest's life and career, so as to lead to amusing anecdotes. The questions to the panel were asked in a series of rounds, each with a theme, such as "The Face, The Music", where the panel would have to identify a composer from their picture, as well as the composer of the music played along with it.

The most demanding round was the "Dummy Keyboard", where Cooper would play a famous piece on a dummy (soundless) instrument, requiring the panel to identify it from hand movements alone. For the benefit of the audience at home, the music in question – which Cooper was hearing through earphones for the purpose of synchronisation – would be slowly faded in as the piece progressed.

Another round was "Hidden Melody" where Cooper would perform a popular tune in the style of a famous composer, while including extracts of works by that composer to help the listeners. Robin Ray, if a member of that week's panel, would typically identify the opus number of the quoted works.

For opera lovers, the panel were shown a filmed performance of one opera with the soundtrack of a different one, and asked to identify both.

Transmissions

Series

Specials

References

External links
 
 

1967 British television series debuts
1984 British television series endings
1960s British game shows
1970s British game shows
1980s British game shows
British panel games
Lost BBC episodes